T-Beauty, or Taiwanese Beauty, refers to beauty products and routines associated with Taiwan.

Overview 
According to NBC "Taiwanese beauty movement focuses on a simple, holistic approach to skin care by using high-quality, natural ingredients and techniques rooted in traditional Chinese medicine." It is also influenced by Taiwan's warm climate with a resulting emphasis on hydrating and lightweight products.

In general it includes four steps: cleanse, tone, moisturize and sheet mask.

History 
The Taiwanese cosmetics industry got its start doing contract manufacturing for Japanese firms like Shiseido and the Kao Corporation.

In the 2000s Taiwanese companies began exporting products under their own name. Early successful brands included My Beauty Diary, Annie's Way, and Maskingdom.

Industry 
Taiwan banned cosmetic testing on animals in 2016.

In 2017 Taiwan exported $730 million worth of cosmetics.

Organization 
The Taiwan Beauty Alliance is an industry organizing group.

See also 
 K-Beauty
 Gua sha

References 

Cosmetic industry
Skin care
Taiwanese culture